The Player is the debut studio album by French house act The Supermen Lovers, released in 2001 by record label BMG. It reached number 96 in the French charts and contains the hit single "Starlight". A second single, "Hard Stuff (Get Your Ticket for a Ride)", was released the following year.

Release 

The Player was released in 2001 by record label BMG. It reached number 96 in the French charts.

Two singles were released from the album: "Starlight", released on 3 September 2001 and a top 10 hit in several countries and "Hard Stuff (Get Your Ticket for a Ride)", released in 2002. Two EPs were also released containing tracks from the album: Ultimate Disco EP (2001), featuring "Dance with You" and Underground Disco EP (2001), featuring "Marathon Man".

Track listing

References 

2001 debut albums
The Supermen Lovers albums
Bertelsmann Music Group albums